The  is a professional wrestling championship owned by the New Japan Pro-Wrestling (NJPW) promotion. NEVER is an acronym of the terms "New Blood", "Evolution", "Valiantly", "Eternal", and "Radical" and was an NJPW-promoted series of events, which featured younger up-and-coming talent and outside wrestlers not signed to the promotion. The project was officially announced on July 12, 2010, and held its first event on August 24, 2010. On October 5, 2012, NJPW announced that NEVER was going to get its own championship, the NEVER Openweight Championship. The current champion is Tama Tonga, who is in his second reign.

The title was originally scheduled to be defended exclusively at NEVER events, but this plan was quickly changed and since its foundation, the title has been defended on the undercards of NJPW events. The original concept of having younger workers wrestle for the title has also not been realized with the first seven holders of the title having been in their thirties or forties. Instead, through the likes of Katsuyori Shibata, Togi Makabe, and Tomohiro Ishii, the NEVER Openweight Championship became known for its "gritty" title matches and "hard hitting" style. Though named an "openweight" championship, NJPW has also categorized the title as a heavyweight title. The title forms what has unofficially been called the "New Japan Triple Crown" (新日本トリプルクラウン, Shin Nihon Toripuru Kuraun) along with the IWGP Heavyweight Championship and the IWGP Intercontinental Championship. The title's openweight nature means that both heavyweight and junior heavyweight wrestlers are eligible to challenge for it.

History

Championship tournament
On October 5, 2012, over two years after the founding of NEVER, New Japan Pro-Wrestling announced the creation of the project's first championship, the NEVER Openweight Championship. The title was originally created with the idea of using it to "elevate younger wrestlers". The first champion was to be determined in a sixteen-man single-elimination tournament, which was set to take place November 15 and 19, 2012. The title and the tournament were announced by New Japan president Naoki Sugabayashi and NEVER regular Tetsuya Naito, who was scheduled to enter the tournament, but was forced to pull out after suffering a knee injury. Much like regular NEVER events, the tournament also featured wrestlers not signed to New Japan; freelancer Daisuke Sasaki, Hiro Tonai, Kengo Mashimo, Ryuichi Sekine, Shiori Asahi and Taishi Takizawa from Kaientai Dojo, and Masato Tanaka from Pro Wrestling Zero1. In the final of the tournament, Tanaka, the 39-year-old, who, despite officially being affiliated with Pro Wrestling Zero1, had worked for NJPW regularly since August 2009, defeated Karl Anderson to become the inaugural NEVER Openweight Champion. Though the title was originally designed to be defended at NEVER events, NJPW has not held a single NEVER event since the championship tournament.

Reigns

There have been 38 reigns shared among 21 wrestlers with one vacancy. Masato Tanaka was the first champion in the title's history. He also holds the record for the longest reign at  days during his only reign. Tomohiro Ishii has the most reigns with six. Michael Elgin's only reign of 8 days is the shortest in the title's history. Minoru Suzuki is the oldest champion when he won it at 52 years old, while Will Ospreay is the youngest champion at 25 years old.

Tama Tonga is the current champion in his second reign. He defeated Karl Anderson on January 4, 2023 at Wrestle Kingdom 17 in Tokyo, Japan.

Belt design
The standard Championship belt has three plates on a black leather strap.

See also
NEVER (professional wrestling)
NEVER Openweight 6-Man Tag Team Championship
IWGP U-30 Openweight Championship

References

External links
Official title history at NJPW.co.jp
Title history at Wrestling-Titles.com

New Japan Pro-Wrestling championships
Openweight wrestling championships